Warke is a surname. Notable people with the surname include:

Larry Warke (1927–1989), Irish cricketer and medical doctor
Robert Warke (1930–2021), Irish bishop
Stephen Warke (born 1959), Irish cricketer
Richard Warke, Canadian billionaire

See also
Ware (surname)
Wark (surname)